Chak No. 69/EB Ugru , is a village in the tehsil of Arifwala, Pakpattan District in the Sahiwal Division in the Punjab province of Pakistan. Total area of this village is 1600 Acre. Ugru is an ancient village of Arifwala city. It has Situated the Grand Mosque"JAMIA MASJID GHOUSIA". It has the shrine of Hazrat GULAM MUHAMMAD HAZOORI, Hazrat Baba Rorde Shah, Hazrat Baba Sufi Abul Majid and Hazrat Baba Sain Ali Bakhsh.

Postal Code=57450

Language
Punjabi is the native language, but Urdu is also widely understood.

Education
Punjab Group of colleges in 69/EB Arifwala
Govt. Boys High School 69/EB ArifWala
Govt. Girls High School 69/EB ArifWala
Alfazal Public SchooL 69/EB Arifwala

Economy
Agriculture is important to the local economy, particularly cotton, grain, potato, wheat and rice, which exported within Pakistan and abroad. There are many industries there, so workers (مذدور) can easily find employment. Majority of the people depend on agriculture. Some residents work abroad and some are teachers.

Castes
Awan (ALvi) 
Jutt
Arain (Chaudhary)
Mughal 
Kharil
Mohal
Rajpoot
Gujjar
other working classes

Sports
Football, cricket, Kabadi

References

Populated places in Pakpattan District